Li Xiaopeng (born 20 June 1975) is a former Chinese international footballer who is the head coach of the China national football team. As a player, he spent his entire pro career at Shandong Luneng, while internationally, he was on his national team in the 2000 AFC Asian Cup, the 2002 FIFA World Cup and the 2004 AFC Asian Cup.

Club career
Li Xiaopeng was a highly promising young player who was playing for the Shandong Luneng youth team before graduating to senior team during the 1994 league season, however it was not until the following season when he played in seventeen league games and score four goals did he start to show his prominence. While he remained a consistent squad regular within the team for the next few seasons it was not until Slobodan Santrač became manager of the team at the beginning of the 1999 league season did Li Xiaopeng really start to become a vital member within the midfield when he aided the team to a league and cup double at the end of the season. Well regarded in China for his good ball-control and vision in passing within the team he would aid Shandong to win another Chinese FA Cup and Chinese Super League cup in 2004. This saw Shandong have another chance to play in the rebranded AFC Champions League where despite being a defensive midfielder, he would score an impressive goal for Shandong Luneng with a lob from 40 meters during an ACL game in 2005 in the 7–2 second leg loss against Al-Ittihad (Jeddah), which was to be one of his last achievements before he retired in 2006.

International career
While Li Xiaopeng was part of the squad that won the AFC U-17 Championship in 1992 he would have to wait until 3 September 2000 before he made his senior international debut in a friendly against Iraq in 4–1 victory. This would be impressive enough for him to be included in the squad for 2000 AFC Asian Cup where despite playing a small role within the tournament he nevertheless saw China finish fourth. After the tournament he would start to form a successful partnership with Li Tie in midfield that saw China qualify for the 2002 FIFA World Cup, which saw him score his debut goal United Arab Emirates in a 3–0 victory during qualifying. While China's debut in the World Cup was not successful, Li Xiaopeng still retained his place within the team until the 2004 AFC Asian Cup which saw the emergence of Zhao Junzhe as his replacement.

Managerial career
After he retired Shandong offered him a position as the boss of media presentation, however due to his high-profile within China he was linked to numerous management positions. He would eventually go on to achieve the necessary coaching certificates required for a management position and he was expected to become an assistant within the Chinese Football Association. On 8 August 2010 he would accept the position of interim head coach for the Chinese women's team up to the 2010 Asian Games, which made him the youngest coach to ever manage the team. At the Games, Li would guide the team to the semi-finals where they lost 1–0 to Japan. This would be good enough for Li to be offered an extension to his contract and guide the team through the 2012 Summer Olympics qualifiers. However, they failed to qualify and Li resigned.

On 3 December 2021, Li was appointed as the new manager of the Chinese national team, succeeding his 2002 World Cup teammate Li Tie. He started his tenure disappointingly with two away losses: 2-0 to Japan and 3-1 to Vietnam.

Honours

Player

China U-17
AFC U-17 Championship: 1992

Shandong Luneng
Chinese Jia-A League: 1999
Chinese FA Cup: 1995, 1999, 2004
Chinese Super League Cup: 2004

References

External links
profile at sinosoc.com
profile at cycnet.com (in Chinese)
2002 World cup profile

1975 births
Living people
Footballers from Qingdao
Chinese footballers
Association football midfielders
Shandong Taishan F.C. players
Chinese Super League players
China international footballers
2000 AFC Asian Cup players
2002 FIFA World Cup players
2004 AFC Asian Cup players
Chinese football managers
China women's national football team managers
Qingdao Hainiu F.C. (1990) managers
Shandong Taishan F.C. managers
Wuhan F.C. managers
Chinese Super League managers
China national football team managers